The McNeil Island Corrections Center (MICC) was a prison in the northwest United States, operated by the Washington State Department of Corrections. It was on McNeil Island in Puget Sound in unincorporated Pierce County, near Steilacoom, Washington.

Opened  in 1875, it had previously served as a territorial correctional facility and then a  Americans sentenced to terms of imprisonment by the United States courts that operated in China in the late nineteenth and early twentieth centuries served their terms at McNeil Island.  In the 1910s, inmates included Robert Stroud, the "Birdman of Alcatraz", who fatally stabbed a prison guard in March 1916.

During World War II, eighty-five Japanese Americans who had resisted the draft to protest their wartime confinement, including civil rights activist Gordon Hirabayashi, were sentenced to prison terms at McNeil; all were pardoned by President Harry S. Truman in 1947.  and novelist James Fogle was sent to McNeil at the age of 17 

The state of Washington began to lease the facility from the federal government in 1981, and later that year the state department of corrections began moving prisoners into the facility, renamed "McNeil Island Corrections Center." The island was deeded to the state government in 1984.

In November 2010, the department announced its plans to close the penitentiary by 2011, saving $14 million in the process.

Notable inmates
Alvin Karpis, Depression-era gangster
Tomoya Kawakita, war criminal and collaborator with Imperial Japan
Gordon Hirabayashi, resister against Japanese American internment during World War II
Mickey Cohen, 1930s Los Angeles gang leader
Robert Franklin Stroud, "The Birdman of Alcatraz" convicted murderer and cause célèbre
Alton Wayne Roberts, convicted by United States v. Price of the murders of Chaney, Goodman, and Schwerner
Vincent Hallinan, 1952 Presidential candidate
 Charles Manson of the Manson Family
 John David Norman, pedophile, sex offender and sex trafficker

See also

List of law enforcement agencies in Washington (state)
List of United States state correction agencies
List of U.S. state prisons

References

Further reading

External links
 * "". Washington State Department of Corrections.
 Oppman, Patrick. "Last island prison in U.S. closes". CNN. April 1, 2011.

2011 disestablishments in Washington (state)
Buildings and structures in Pierce County, Washington
Prisons in Washington (state)
United States Penitentiaries
1875 establishments in Washington Territory